There was due to be a single group of three teams containing Belgium, Malta and Norway. But Belgium withdrew leaving Malta and Norway to play a one-off match.

On 4 June Malta came from 10–0 down midway through the first half to defeat Norway, 30–20 to take the Rugby League European Federation Bowl at the Victor Tedesco Stadium, Hamrun.

See also

References

External links

European rugby league competitions
2010 in rugby league